Genetics for Beginners, republished as Introducing Genetics, is a 1993 graphic study guide to Genetics written by Steve Jones and illustrated by Borin Van Loon. The volume, according to the publisher's website, "takes readers on a journey through this new science to the discovery of DNA and the heart of the human gene map," and, "gives us the information," to, "make moral decisions where genetics plays a part."

Publication history
This volume was originally published in the UK by Icon Books in 1993 as Genetics for Beginners, and subsequently republished with different covers as Introducing Genetics and Introducing Genetics: A Graphic Guide.

The book was described, by illustrator Borin Van Loon, as a companion to Darwin for Beginners (1982), a previous volume in the series, and as a stand in for the long out-of-print DNA for Beginners (1983), both of which he illustrated.

Editions:

Related volumes in the series:

Reception

Legacy
Van Loon's illustrations from this book provided the inspiration for his Health Matters Gallery mural at the Science Museum, London, which was opened on 9 June 1994 by Professor James Watson, and were featured in the special exhibition, Representations of DNA, at the Whipple Museum of the History of Science in Cambridge in 2003.

References

1993 in comics
Books by Steve Jones (biologist)
Educational comics
Non-fiction graphic novels
Popular science books